Caher West Top at ,  is the fifth-highest peak in Ireland on the Irish Vandeleur-Lynam classification, and  part of the MacGillycuddy's Reeks range.  Caher West Top is the only Furth to have a prominence below .

Geography 

The mountain is located about 500 metres west of Caher East Top and is part of the MacGillycuddy's Reeks of County Kerry.  Caher West Top is often climbed as part of the Coomloughra Horseshoe, which takes 6-8 hours and is described as "one of Ireland’s classic ridge walks".  The horseshoe takes in other neighbouring peaks such as Carrauntoohil, Beenkeragh, The Bones (including the Beenkeragh Ridge), Skregmore, and Cnoc Iochtair. 

Climbers refer to the narrow path that runs along the top of Caher West Top and neighboring Caher, as Caher Ridge.

Caher West Top is regarded by the Scottish Mountaineering Club ("SMC") as one of 34 Furths, which is a mountain above  in elevation, and meets the other SMC criteria for a Munro (e.g. "sufficient separation"), but which is outside of (or furth) Scotland; which is why Caher West Top is sometimes referred to as one of the 13 Irish Munros; it is the only one of the 34 Furths on the official SMC list that has a topographic prominence below .

Because of Caher West Top's low prominence, it does not appear in the Irish Arderin classification, or the British Isles Simm and Hewitt classifications.

See also 
 Lists of mountains in Ireland
 List of mountains of the British Isles by height
 List of Furth mountains in the British Isles

References

External links
MountainViews: The Irish Mountain Website, Caher West Top
MountainViews: Irish Online Mountain Database
The Database of British and Irish Hills , the largest database of British Isles mountains ("DoBIH")
Hill Bagging UK & Ireland, the searchable interface for the DoBIH
Ordnance Survey Ireland ("OSI") Online Map Viewer
Logainm: Placenames Database of Ireland

Mountains and hills of County Kerry
Furths
Mountains under 1000 metres